Anatchaya Suputhipong (born ), better known by her nickname Natty (Hangul: 나띠), is a Thai singer based in South Korea, best known as a contestant on Mnet's girl group survival programs Sixteen and Idol School. She made her debut as a soloist on May 7, 2020, with the single album Nineteen.

Career

2015–2017: Sixteen, Idol School and departure from JYP
In May 2015, Natty participated in Mnet reality survival program Sixteen where she was pitted against 15 other trainees from JYPE to secure a spot in the label's next girl group after Miss A and Wonder girls, later revealed to be named Twice. However, she was eliminated in the final round, thus continuing as a trainee under the label.

In July 2017, Natty participated in Mnet reality survival program Idol School to compete with 40 other contestants for an opportunity to debut in a 9-member girl group, later revealed to be named Fromis 9. However, she was eliminated from the potential debut group in which she ranked 13th in final episode.

2020–present: Solo debut
On April 6, 2020, Natty signed with Swing Entertainment. Her debut single album Nineteen was released on May 7, along with its accompanying music video. She made her first music show appearance as a solo artist on KBS's Music Bank on May 8.

Natty returned with her second single album Teddy Bear on November 12, 2020. In her music video for the album's titular song she shows the crest of New College, Oxford. 

On July 12, 2022, Natty signed with S2 Entertainment.

Discography

Single albums

Singles

Filmography

Television shows

Awards and nominations

Notes

References 

2002 births
Living people
Musicians from Bangkok
Swing Entertainment artists
K-pop singers
Thai pop singers
Korean-language singers of Thailand

Thai expatriates in South Korea
21st-century Thai women singers